Elnoretta is a genus of true crane fly.

Distribution
Chile.

Species
E. acracanthoides Alexander, 1929

References

Tipulidae
Diptera of South America
Endemic fauna of Chile